The Ottawa Braves are the athletic teams that represent Ottawa University, located in Ottawa, Kansas, in intercollegiate sports as a member of the National Association of Intercollegiate Athletics (NAIA), primarily competing in the Kansas Collegiate Athletic Conference (KCAC) since the 1982–83 academic year; which they were a member on a previous stint from their charter member days in 1902–03 to 1970–71). The Braves previously competed as a charter member of the Heart of America Athletic Conference (HAAC) from 1971–72 to 1981–82.

Varsity teams
Ottawa competes in 31 intercollegiate varsity athletic teams: Men's sports include baseball, basketball, bowling, cross country, football, golf, lacrosse, powerlifting, soccer, tennis, track & field, volleyball and wrestling; while women's sports include basketball, beach volleyball, bowling, cross country, flag football, golf, lacrosse, powerlifting, soccer, softball, stunt, tennis, track & field, volleyball and wrestling; and co-ed sports include competitive cheer, competitive dance and eSports. Also OU offers varied intramural programs.

Football

Ottawa University first put a football team on the field in 1891. As of the conclusion of the 2008 season, the total record of the football team is 117 years, 970 games, 502 victories, 421 defeats, 47 ties. The current 2009 season has the Braves 10–0 and conference champions. The first time in the history of the school that this has happened. They are currently ranked number 20 in the nation. The current football coach is Nick Davis, who took over starting in 2022.

The team plays their games at AdventHealth Field

Bowl games and postseason play
In 1972, Ottawa defeated the Friends University Falcons in the Mineral Water Bowl by a score of 27–20.

Ottawa's football team has qualified for the 2009, 2010, and 2011 NAIA Football National Championship playoffs. This gives them three consecutive post-season appearances.

References

External links